Nigeria competed at the 2004 Summer Paralympics in Athens, Greece. The team included 14 athletes, 6 men and 8 women. Competitors from Nigeria won 12 medals, including 5 gold, 4 silver and 3 bronze.

In many parts of Black Africa, people who have disabilities that include insanity, and physical disabilities such as impairments and deformities often face cultural barriers to participation because of attitudes related to their disabilities.  These include beliefs that they acquired their disabilities because their parents were witches or they are wizards.  Their disability is often seen as a result of a personal failing on their part.  As such, there is often tremendous cultural pressure for people with physical disabilities to remain hidden and out of the public eye.  In many places, they are perceived to be monsters in need of healing.  This is the context to which Nigerian Paralympians engage both society and sport internally, in their own country.

Medals 
Competitors from Nigeria won 12 medals, including 5 gold, 4 silver and 3 bronze to finish 28th in the medal table. The Nigerian Paralympic delegation left the Games having won more medals than their Olympic counterparts.

Sports

Athletics

Men's track

Men's field

Women's field

Powerlifting

Men

Women

See also
Nigeria at the Paralympics
Nigeria at the 2004 Summer Olympics

References 

Nations at the 2004 Summer Paralympics
2004
Summer Paralympics